Eugène Daignault (September 14, 1895 in Saint Albans, Vermont – January 27, 1960 in Montreal) was an American-Canadian performer, known for his music, his comedy, and his radio performances – in particular, on the Société Radio-Canada soap opera Un homme et son péché, where he portrayed "Pere Ovide" from 1949 to 1960.

His radio career began in 1922, with a performance on CKAC radio mere days after its launch.

In 1926, he signed a recording contract with the Canadian branch of Starr Records, for whom he recorded 93 songs, some of which were in collaboration with Mary Bolduc; He also recorded for Bluebird Records beginning in 1942.

References

External links

Eugène Daignault items in the collection of Library and Archives Canada

1895 births
1960 deaths
People from St. Albans, Vermont
American emigrants to Canada
American male radio actors
Canadian male radio actors
Male actors from Montreal
20th-century American male actors
20th-century Canadian male actors